In human genetics, Haplogroup S is a human mitochondrial DNA (mtDNA) haplogroup found only among Indigenous Australians. It is a descendant of macrohaplogroup N.

Origin
Haplogroup S mtDNA evolved within Australia between 64,000 and 40,000 years ago (51 kya).

Distribution
It is found in the Indigenous Australian population. Haplogroup S2 found in Willandra Lakes human remain WLH4 dated back Late Holocene (3,000-500 years ago).

Subclades

Tree
This phylogenetic tree of haplogroup S subclades is based on the paper by Mannis van Oven and Manfred Kayser Updated comprehensive phylogenetic tree of global human mitochondrial DNA variation and subsequent published research. The TMRCA for haplogroup S is between 49 and 51 KYA according to Nano Nagle's Aboriginal Australian mitochondrial genome variation – an increased understanding of population antiquity and diversity publication that published in 2017.

S (64-40 kya) in Australia
S1 (53-32 kya) in Australia
S1a (44-29 kya) found in WA, NT, QLD and NSW
S1b (37-22 kya) found in NT, QLD and NSW
S1b1 (30-10 kya) found in NT and QLD
S1b1a (24-6 kya) found in QLD
S1b2 (17-3 kya) found in QLD
S1b3 (20-4 kya) found in QLD and NSW
S2 (44-22 kya) in Australia
S2a (38-18 kya) found in NT, QLD, NSW and TAS
S2a1 (31-12 kya) found in NSW, QLD and TAS
S2a1a (19-6 kya) found in NSW and QLD
S2a2 (38-11 kya) found in NT, QLD and NSW
S2b (42-18 kya) found in WA, NT, QLD and VIC
S2b1(27-9 kya) found in NT, QLD and VIC
S2b2 (37-12 kya) found in WA, NT and QLD
S3 (17-1 kya) found in NT
S4 found in NT
S5 found in WA
S6 found in NSW

See also 

Genealogical DNA test
Genetic genealogy
Human mitochondrial genetics
Population genetics

References

External links
Ian Logan's Mitochondrial DNA Site
Mannis van Oven's Phylotree

S